This is the list of characters appearing in the Onegai My Melody anime series.

Human characters

The human protagonist of the series. Born on November 19, Uta becomes My Melody's first human friend. She is the first person to fall victim to Kuromi's Melody Key. She has an older sister called Kanade who is a beautiful and popular student in senior high school and a younger sister Koto, who is a very happy girl. Uta is also very cheerful and energetic; and well known for her honey brown curled pigtails and big hazel eyes. She has a crush on Keichii. When she sings she can power up the Melody Tact by singing, just like how Jun and Keichii power up the Melody Key. In episode 4 of the first series, it is mentioned that her mother is a "Star in the Heavens", meaning she passes away long before the events of the series take place. In Onegai My Melody Sukkiri, she became Kogure's girlfriend. 3 Years later after Sukkiri, she is reunited with My Melody in the High School Arc to stop the Dokurobou. She has also been seen in Kirara★ in the last episode.

One of Uta's friends and Flat's human best friend. Kakeru has known her since they were little. He has a crush on Uta. He had bullied Uta when they were young and now regrets it, hoping the past will be put aside as he attempts to tell her how he feels. He confessed his love to Uta in Onegai My Melody Kurukuru Shuffle. His first kiss was accidentally taken by Keichii, his second by Jun, and his third by Baku. In Onegai My Melody Sukkiri, he became Uta's boyfriend. He has brown hair and eyes.

Uta's hard-working father who works as a travelogue writer. Whenever he approaches a room in the house, especially the kitchen, Uta would try to hide My Melody away and pretend that My Melo was a stuffed animal. He once trembled when he saw My Melody serving him coffee in front. Kuromi one time cast a spell on him, making Masahiko's time faster than normal Earth time. He at last befriended My Melody when her brother and grandfather freed him from the spell. He loves making jokes and puns, much to his daughters' dismay. He also dreams of eternal laughter in his house. When he discovers that Uta and Kogure were dating in Sukkiri, he is at first furious, but then accepts it.

 

A famous violinist and teen heartthrob, Keichii's violin playing supplies Kuromi's Melody Key with Dark Power in the first series being the apparent chosen of the Melody Bow. Though very popular around girls he is often secretly agitated or indifferent to ladies. He joins Kuromi's side to unleash the Dark Power seemingly out of boredom but soon is the de facto leader of Kuromi's group. He is not above subterfuge to further his goals and keep the knowledge he is working with My Melody's enemies a secret from the heroes though he interacts with them freely.  In ~Kurukuru Shuffle!~, he transforms into Usamimi Kamen with My Melody's magic. Forced to become My Melo's super hero due to his actions in the first season, he absolutely hates becoming Usamimi Kamen, as he is often apathetic and unenergetic when My Melo summons him. He also has a butler called Sebastian.

Keiichi's younger brother who comes home after several years in a Japanese school for boys at London. Appears in ~Kurukuru Shuffle!~ and replaces his brother as Kuromi's source for the Dark Power. Jun has a crush on Uta but is rejected several times. He is constantly taunting his older brother, making Keiichi direct his anger at Jun. This causes Jun to become very depressed and angry, which results in the Dar-chan taking over his conscious. Jun plays the electric guitar and is always seen carrying it. He also has a butler, Sebastan, who is Sebastian's younger brother.

A tomboyish red-haired girl who has been one of Uta's friends since elementary school. She is athletic and has a fear of cute things. She is very good friends with Kakeru. Whenever Kuromi and Baku created chaos, she would often kick them out of the vicinity. She has a frog named Kojiro. Whenever My Melo comes near or talks to her, she would often freak out in the same way another person would if they came in contact with a rat or a spider.

Uta's best friend since kindergarten who has short navy blue hair in a braid and big dark eyes. Loves happy, dramatic and romantic things. She is often seen reciting poems she has written (which others do not like) and she also likes to draw. Miki also has a crush on Keiichi Hiiragi but is fine just cheering Uta on when it comes to their relationship. She is also Piano's human best friend.

Kirara is the human protagonist of Onegai My Melody: Kirara★ and the first Human being that My Melo meets. She came to Mary Land from the Human World and befriended My Melody and her friends, telling her about an important event about the Wishing Star arriving at Mari Land that would grant everyone's wish. But at the night of that event, the Wishing Star broke into pieces and got scattered throughout Mari Land. Unable to return to the Human World, she and My Melody were chosen to gather all the Wishing Star fragments throughout the land so she could return to back to the Human World. She also has the Heart and Star Pendant to do magic along with My Melody.

Mary Land Denizens

My Melody is the denizen protagonist of the series, is a rabbit from Mary Land. Throughout the show, she is shown wearing a pink hood that also covers her ears. With adequate cooking ability, My Melody is the one who prepares meals for Uta and her family. Her nickname is My Melo. The magic that comes from her tact can only be used as an antidote to Kuromi's spell. When she waves the tact, a small heart sticker attaches to an object and brings it to life. The animated object then helps to reverse the effects of Kuromi's magic. Sometimes, the animated object won't be able to perform the specific task it needs to. My Melody will then smile at it sweetly and say, "[object name] Onegai?" ("[object name] Please?"). This causes the enchanted object's power to intensify, sometimes increasing its size. Surprisingly, even Kuromi has become one of the things Melody used her magic on which was seen in one episode.

As a very cheerful individual, My Melody is never seen angry. She can be a bit scatterbrained and oblivious to things though. She also doesn't seem to have any affections for anybody the way Kuromi and Uta have for Keiichi, although she is quite fond of Rabbit Eared Mask. To travel from place to place, My Melody uses a pink umbrella which enables her to fly. This was until Kuromi stole and used it to go to Mary Land. Since then, she started sharing with Flat's umbrella. She regains it back in the second season.

She has two magical items. The first one is the Melody Tact, which she uses to cast magic by waving it like a maestro's baton. In ~Kurukuru Shuffle!~, the Melody Tact was upgraded into the Hyper Melody Tact by the king, but in Sukkiri♪, it was destroyed in the final battle, making it useless, although it was repaired a short time later by the Melody Box. The second is the Heart and Star Pendant, which appeared in Onegai My Melody Kirara★, My Melody uses it to do magic along with Kirara.

A blue mouse with yellow ears who wears an orange or pink ribbon on his tail. He is the closest among My Melody's animal friends. Whenever there's trouble, especially a curse created by Kuromi's magic, My Melody sometimes casts a spell on Flat to deal with it. There have also been hints that Flat may have a crush on My Melody, for example blushing when she hugs him in episode 6. He also asked her out on a date in episode 29. (Which at first My Melo was surprised but eventually agreed.)

Flat also has great social skills when it comes to interacting with the opposite gender. With these, he occasionally gives pointers to Kakeru when trying to contact Uta in certain situations.

Piano is a sheep with pink wool. Behind only to Flat, she is Melody's second-closest animal friend. Though she can't actually speak, she does have talent in playing keyboards. It was hinted in Onegai My Melody Kirara★ that she also has good Knitting Skills, and in the first season that she is good at writing poetry. She is also Miki's animal best friend.

The Ruler of Mary Land, who's an elephant and has a crush on Kanade. Whenever he expresses affection for Uta's older sister or any other attractive woman, his wife (also an elephant) causes lightning to strike at him. Despite his goofy looks and attitude, he is very wise and magic wise, he can detect the presence of the Spirit of Dark Power.

Sorara is the prince of the Star Kingdom. Thirteen years old, he came to Mary Land alongside the Wishing Star after it crashed and scattering it to a million pieces. Although he looks human, he somehow transforms into a chick-like creature, much to his dismay. He's somehow bad-mouthed and rude, though he shows his softer side when he's around Kirara. Although he's stuck in Mary Land like Kirara, he made his temporary living place in one part of the town and sometimes he causes troubles to Kirara and My Melody then helping him get home to the Stars. In the end of the series, the Wishing Star is finally repaired and finally got back home, which resulted on repairing the portal back to the Human World.

Antagonists
 

Kuromi is My Melody's Rival, a rabbit who wears a black joker's hat with a pink skull at the center of her forehead. The skull's facial expression changes to match Kuromi's mood. Wielding a magical artifact called the Melody Key, which is infused with dark dream-corrupting powers, Kuromi is trying to collect 100 Black Notes in order to resurrect the Spirit of Dark Power, in the hopes that it will destroy her enemies, especially My Melody. Her tail is a weak point wherein she would fall unconscious if someone were to step on it or pull it.

She is an escaped prisoner from Mary Land. She was arrested but it was later revealed that Kuromi committed crimes like stealing bread in order to feed Baku's poor family. When Kuromi was on trial, Baku tried to convince the judge that he too was responsible. But Kuromi claimed that Baku was lying, so that her friend wouldn't share a similar fate. What started her grudge towards My Melo was an incident where My Melo unknowingly tore a page from her journal to wipe Piano the sheep's nose. Since then, Kuromi has been writing down on it all the mishaps and unfavorable moments that My Melo has caused her (accidentally). More than 3,000 events written (6342 exactly at the start of the series), Kuromi sometimes reads them in front of My Melo, but My Melo seems oblivious to why Kuromi's so upset over them. Whenever My Melody does something to trigger Kuromi's frothing rage, she'll read an entry from the notebook, stating the entry number and cutting away into a flashback showcasing what happened.

Kuromi is the leader of a biker gang known as "Kuromi's 5." Other members include a purple cat named Nyanmi, a pale orange dog named Wanmi, a white fox named Konmi, and a grey and white rat named Chumi. They all wear black and drive around in a menacing fashion.

Just like Uta, Kuromi has affections for Hiiragi. Her affections for him seem somewhat stronger than Uta's, however. A running gag throughout the series involves Kuromi's strange fantasy sequences involving Hiiragi and sometimes his brother, Jun. In Sukkiri, Baku makes Kuromi a dakimakura with Hiiragi's face on it. In one episode, Kuromi used the power of the Melody Key to turn herself into a human being so she could dance with him, taking the pseudonym Kurumi Nui.  Hiiragi actually seemed to be very attracted to Kurumi Nui, but, unfortunately, the spell had a Cinderella-esque effect: if Kuromi did not return to the spell-casting circle before all the magical candles blew out, she'd be turned into a tapir like Baku.  Because of this, she had to run away in the middle of dancing with Hiiragi, but he kissed her hand in farewell. In the show's opening theme prior to this episode, Kuromi is seen in the rain under a blue umbrella (Uta is usually in this part). Kuromi also turns into Kurumi Nui in episode 31 of KuruKuru Shuffle and makes an appearance in episode 36 of the first series in part of Hiiragi's dream, though she has no speaking lines.

Besides being desperate, Kuromi also has a bit of a good side. On Christmas Eve, she first refused to accept the gift her parents' gave because she was still displeased on why nobody, not even them, came to visit when she was imprisoned. But with it include a letter telling that her parents still cherished her and that they even tried to come inside the dungeon but weren't permitted. Deeply touched by this, Kuromi accepted the present. She then returned to Uta whom she ignored to help earlier. Combined with My Melo's magic with some from Santa Claus, Kuromi helped summoned the spirit of Uta's deceased mother (how this person died isn't known).

Kuromi is quite lazy, angry and a bit of a glutton, but despite her tomboyish characteristics, she's also very feminine. Kuromi shows great interest in weddings, lolita fashion, and romance novels and manga. She enjoys napping and designing wedding dresses, though Baku has stated that he doesn't like her fashion sense. Kuromi considers herself to be high-maintenance, forcing Baku and anyone she casts dark magic on to call her "Kuromi-sama". She often refers to herself as "pretty devil girl Kuromi-chan".

A purple tapir and Kuromi's sidekick with the ability to fly. He, in some episodes, appears to have a crush on Kuromi, and is often victim to Kuromi's anger. Kuromi is frequently very physically abusive to him, but regardless, she truly does love him, despite the fact that they're both animals, they have a master-pet relationship.

Like Kuromi, Baku has a journal where he writes down his moments with her. Hiiragi burns it in the middle of the first season, but he somehow retrieves it in the second season when they break out of jail.

His birthday is confirmed to be on February 29. His name is a bit of a pun: in Japanese, baku could mean a tapir or a dream-eating creature of Japanese mythology. In one episode he has a crush on Uta. He does appear to have a conscience. On one occasion, he was seen delivering newspapers and giving rides to children. Baku has the ability to sniff out Black Notes, and whenever a new one is obtained, Kuromi skewers it with a magical stick and Baku eats it for safekeeping.  Baku first met Kuromi at a beach in Mari Land.  Baku usually says "Zona" at the end of his sentences, a lot like a catchphrase which is common of anime characters.

The antagonist of all four series. A mysterious being that is able to inhabit those who tamper with the Dark Power or have powerful dreams. Because Kuromi's too lazy to say his entire name, she shortens it to "Dar-chan", much to his disgust. When he possesses individuals, they often have small changes in  appearance. When he possessed Baku, he gave off a sparkly glow. When he possessed Hiiragi, he gained slightly darker appearance, gaining red eyes and darker hair. As for Jun, he gained a much stranger style of clothing and many demon features.

Cameos
, the mascot for Sanrio, appears in the eyecatches of the first and second anime.

Berry and Cherry are two demons in Mary Land living in the world called , which is the name Cinnamoroll spelled backwards. The duo serves as the narrators of Onegai My Melody Kirara★ and usually appears in eyecatches.

References

Onegai My Melody